Leena Estelle Luostarinen (15 May 1949 – 28 July 2013) was a Finnish painter. Working as an artist for over forty years, she was well known for her colourful and mysterious works. Many of her paintings featured felines, ibises, flowers, and sphinxes.

Luostarinen received various awards and grants during her lifetime, including the Pro Finlandia Medal in 1995.

References

Finnish painters
1949 births
2013 deaths
Pro Finlandia Medals of the Order of the Lion of Finland
20th-century Finnish women artists
21st-century Finnish women artists